Guilherme Winter Nóbrega de Almeida (born August 28, 1979), commonly known as Guilherme Winter, is a Brazilian actor. He is best known for his portrayal of Moses in Os Dez Mandamentos.

Biography 
Before becoming an actor, he studied industrial design at the University Presbiteriana Mackenzie, but abandoned this pursuit to work in a holiday resort. It was there that he had his first experiences as an actor.

In 2001, he had a daughter, Sabrina, who disappeared from the hospital when she was born and is missing to this day.

In 2004, he moved to Rio de Janeiro, and took a course in performance in the Casa das Artes de Laranjeirasen (CAL).

While filming Os Dez Mandamentos, he began courting and since then has been together with co star Brazilian-Mexican actress Giselle Itié.

Filmography

Television

References

External links 

1979 births
Living people
Male actors from São Paulo
Brazilian male television actors
Brazilian male telenovela actors
Brazilian male film actors